Iain Forsyth and Jane Pollard are British artists and filmmakers.

Life and work
Forsyth and Pollard met and began working collaboratively while studying Fine Art and Art Theory at Goldsmiths College, graduating together in 1995. They initially focused on live performance events, but since 2003 their work has been predominantly film and video based. They returned to Goldsmiths in 2002, receiving an MA degree in Fine Art in 2004.

They have restaged David Bowie's farewell performance as Ziggy Stardust, a 1973 video work by Vito Acconci (working with rap artist Plan B) and a 1968 work by Bruce Nauman. In 2003 the artists recreated the 1978 Cramps performance at the Napa Mental Institute at the ICA in a work entitled File under Sacred Music. The work caused some controversy  by including an audience of patients undergoing psychiatric care. The musicians were assembled by Forsyth and Pollard for the project and included Alfonso Pinto from The Parkinsons as Lux Interior, Holly Golightly as Poison Ivy, former Headcoat Bruce Brand as Bryan Gregory and John Gibbs as longtime Cramps drummer Nick Knox.

Silent Sound, featuring an original score by J. Spaceman, was presented at the 2006 Liverpool Biennial. The piece was originally presented as a live performance that took place in the Small Concert Hall at St. George's Hall, Liverpool. It was based, in part, on the public séance act performed by Victorian entertainers The Davenport Brothers. During the performance the artists were seated on-stage inside a soundproof booth based on the Davenport's "Spirit Cabinet". Together they recited a single phrase into a microphone, which was fed into a machine they had created that claimed to embed the phrase as a subliminal message into the music, which was performed live by a small orchestra. The Davenport Brothers had performed their act on the same stage in 1865. The performance was introduced by Ciarán O'Keeffe, a British parapsychologist who became famous after appearing as the resident skeptic on the paranormal television series Most Haunted. An installation of "Silent Sound" was then presented by A Foundation at Greenland Street, Liverpool. An ambisonic recording of the live performance was incorporated into a large-scale immersive installation, created in consultation with acousticians from Arup. The installation was recreated inside a shipping container in 2008 for Art Basel Miami Beach where it was described by the New York Times as "one of the fair's biggest word-of-mouth hits". In 2010 Silent Sound was re-presented as part of the AV Festival at Middlesbrough Town Hall.

Begun while at college, their first project together was publishing "Words & Pictures" - an art magazine in a box. Published three times per year from May 1994 until November 1997 each issue collected together objects made by 20 different artists into an A5 sized cardboard box, produced in a signed and numbered limited edition of 100 copies. A printed booklet was included that contained information on the contributors as well as a specially commissioned preface and introductory text. The first issue was launched at the Institute of Contemporary Arts in London, with a preface by Scottish singer/songwriter Momus and an introduction by artist and writer Liam Gillick. Artists contributing to the project included Martin Creed, Jeremy Deller, Matthew Higgs, Bob and Roberta Smith, Georgina Starr and David Shrigley. Writers for the project included Tracey Emin, Angus Fairhurst, Billy Childish, Jake Chapman, Billy Childish and Joshua Compston. Forsyth and Pollard ended the project after 10 issues, citing the influence of the British indie band Felt who released ten albums in ten years and then disbanded.

In 2008 they directed the promo videos for the Nick Cave & The Bad Seeds singles Dig, Lazarus, Dig!!!, "More News From Nowhere" and "Midnight Man". They have also worked with Nick Cave & The Bad Seeds on a series of films relating to each of the 14 studio albums produced by the band. Collectively titled "Do you love me like I love you" each film will feature on a DVD accompanying the album it relates to as part of the remastered Collector's Editions released by Mute Records throughout 2009. Continuing their association with Nick Cave, the duo produced and sound-directed the audiobook for his novel The Death of Bunny Munro, working with the acoustics department at Arup to produce a spatialized binaural mix which creates a 3D effect when played on headphones. It was published by Canongate Books in September 2009.

Occasionally directing music videos for other artists, they have also worked with The Veils, Fanfarlo, Tindersticks, Scott Walker and Gil Scott-Heron.

In 2009 they were commissioned by the British Film Institute to produce a new work for the BFI Gallery (the contemporary art space at BFI Southbank) called "Radio Mania: An Abandoned Work" a multi-screen 3D video installation featuring Kevin Eldon, Caroline Catz, Terrence Hardiman and Fenella Fielding with Martians played by Ben Crompton, Iain Lee and Ben Moor. The project was curated by Elisabetta Fabrizi, who invited the artists to access the BFI National Archive of film and television, the largest of its kind in the world, to create a new commission.

Their first major survey show was presented by the South London Gallery in February–March 2011. In January 2012 they were nominated for the Samsung Art+ Prize.

Iain Forsyth and Jane Pollard are currently represented by Kate MacGarry (London). They have previously worked with Lawrence Eng Gallery (Vancouver) and Galleria Paolo Bonzano (Rome). They are represented as filmmakers by Josh Varney at 42.

Their first feature film was announced by Film4. The hybrid drama-documentary titled 20,000 Days on Earth focusses on the musician and writer Nick Cave, and is backed by Film4, BFI and Corniche Pictures. The film is produced by Pulse Films and JW Films and cinematography is by Erik Wilson (Submarine, Tyrannosaur, The Imposter, The Double). An interview in The Guardian with the directors revealed that the film will also star Kylie Minogue and Ray Winstone. Forsyth & Pollard won the Directing Award  at the Sundance Film Festival in January 2014, where the film premiered. The Editing Award was also presented to Jonathan Amos for 20,000 Days on Earth. The European premiere was in February 2014 at Berlinale in Berlin. A theatrical release took place in September 2014 by Picturehouse in the UK, Drafthouse in the US and Madman in Australia.

In 2014 they were shortlisted for the Jarman Award and were awarded a Channel 4 Random Acts Commission. Forsyth and Pollard were presented with the Douglas Hickox Award for best debut director at the 2014 Moët British Independent Film Awards. They have also been BAFTA nominated for Best Documentary  and shortlisted for the London Film Critic's Circle Award.

Filmography

Feature films

Short films

Collections
Public collections include:
Tate Gallery
Arts Council Collection
Zabludowicz Collection
Government Art Collection
Musée d’art moderne Grand-Duc Jean Luxembourg (Mudam)
Museum De Hallen, Haarlem
BFI National Archive

Exhibitions
Solo Exhibitions
2013 Bish Bosch: Ambisymphonic (with Scott Walker), Sydney Opera House
2013 Jumpers (What must I do to be saved), Live at LICA, Lancaster
2011 Audience/Performer, Lighthouse, Brighton
2011 New Work, Kate MacGarry, London
2011 Romeo Echo Delta, FACT Liverpool and BBC Radio Merseyside
2011 Soon, Nuit Blanche, Toronto
2011 PUBLICSFEAR, South London Gallery, London
2010 Silent Sound, AV Festival, Middlesbrough
2009 Radio Mania: An Abandoned Work, BFI Gallery, London (curated by Elisabetta Fabrizi)
2009 Iain Forsyth & Jane Pollard, Void Gallery, Derry
2009 Performer. Audience. Fuck Off., Site Gallery, Sheffield (performed by Iain Lee)
2008 Run For Me, Great North Run Moving Image Commission, Baltic Centre for Contemporary Art, Gateshead
2008 Walking Over Acconci (Misdirected Reproaches), Kate MacGarry, London
2008 "Run For Me" Artprojx at Prince Charles Cinema, London (introduced by Andrew Graham-Dixon)
2008 "Iain Forsyth & Jane Pollard", Lawrence Eng, Vancouver
2007 Silent Sound, Art Basel Miami Beach/ Art Positions
2007 Grain - an exploration of contemporary landscape using sound, Grain Power Station, Isle of Grain, Kent
2007 The 24 seven, Milton Keynes Gallery Project
2007 Precious Little, Moving Image Centre Toi Rerehiko, Auckland, New Zealand, touring to The Physics Room, Christchurch
2007 The Weasel: Pop Music and Contemporary Art, South London Gallery
2007 Kiss My Nauman, Jarvis Cocker’s Meltdown, Southbank Centre, London
2006 Silent Sound, A Foundation/Greenland Street, Liverpool
2006 In Brief, Jerwood Space, London
2005 Anyone else isn't you, George Rodger Gallery, Maidstone
2005 Walking After Acconci (Redirected Approaches), Kate MacGarry, London
2005 Anyone else isn't you, The Hospital, Covent Garden, London
2004 Everybody else is wrong, Pavilion, Montreal, Canada
2003 File under Sacred Music, Institute of Contemporary Arts, London
1998 A Rock 'N' Roll Suicide, Institute of Contemporary Arts, London
1998 The kids are alright, Institute of Contemporary Arts, London
1997 The Smiths is dead, Institute of Contemporary Arts, London
1997 Doing it for the Kids, Bluecoat Arts Centre, Liverpool
1996 The World Won't Listen, 30 Underwood Street, London

References

External links
 Official site

Art duos
Alumni of Goldsmiths, University of London
English installation artists
British video artists
Women video artists
Living people
British performance artists
English music video directors
1972 births
1973 births
People from Bolton
People from Gateshead
Filmmaking duos
English contemporary artists